HMS Anson was a 60-gun fourth rate ship of the line of the Royal Navy, built at Bursledon by Philemon Ewer to the draught specified by the 1745 Establishment, and launched on 10 October 1747.

Anson served until 1773, when she was sold out of the navy.

Today, a model of the ship appears on a monument to Ewer in Bursledon parish church.

Notes

References

Lavery, Brian (2003) The Ship of the Line - Volume 1: The development of the battlefleet 1650-1850. Conway Maritime Press. .
William Page (editor) (1908) 'Parishes: Bursledon', A History of the County of Hampshire: Volume 3 (1908), pp. 283-84. British History Online. Retrieved 29 June 2007.

Ships of the line of the Royal Navy
1747 ships
Ships built on the River Hamble